Rajya Sabha elections were held in India on 21 July and 8 August 2017 as nomination contests by state legislators routinely for ten members of the Rajya Sabha across three states, replacing those who retired in July and August 2017. The State Legislatures which contribute in this six-year minor elections/nomination cycle are Goa, Gujarat and West Bengal.  The mechanism is the single transferable vote (STV) among legislators, meaning nominations may be unopposed contests (commonly in states with an absolute majority for a particular party in its legislative, public elections). The open ballot is used rather than secret ballot, allowing public scrutiny.

The year also saw five by-elections one of which saw a state's co-representative change, owing to a change in the make-up of the relevant legislature in the intervening three years.

The 2017 six-yearly cycle is of great importance to Goa, where its sole Rajya Sabha member is chosen by its current legislators; 3 of 11 members for Gujarat and 6 of 16 members are also so elected (see cross-party nomination contests) in this cycle.

The outcome in party terms, which tends to reflect the current popular political make-up of the relevant legislatures, was primarily no change (12 of the 15 seats involved in 2017). The other three seats to reflect state political changes were two intervening sufficient mathematical state gains in support for the VJP at state elections, at the expense of the INC entitling two VJP nominations rather than INC and one state gain in support (sufficient proportional representation swing) for the AITC which had cost the Communist Party of India (Marxist), specifically in West Bengal.

Members retiring
The following members retired in 2017.

Members elected

Goa
Goa's main party in its legislature saw its nomination contest for Goa's sole seat on July 21, 2017.

Gujarat
Gujarat had an election for 3 Rajya Sabha seats on August 8, 2017.

West Bengal
West Bengal had elected the 6 Rajya Sabha seat unopposed.

By-elections
In addition to scheduled elections, unforeseen vacancies, caused by members' resignation or death, may also be filled via By-elections.

West Bengal

 On 29 December 2016, Mithun Chakraborty, a Trinamool Congress member from West Bengal, resigned his seat, citing health reasons.

Odisha

 On 21 March 2017, Bishnu Charan Das of Odisha resigned after he was appointed as Deputy Chairman of Odisha State Planning Board.

Manipur

 On 28 February 2017, Manipur representative Haji Abdul Salam died.

Madhya Pradesh

 On 18 May 2017, Anil Madhav Dave, a Bharatiya Janata Party member from Madhya Pradesh died.

Rajasthan

 On 10 August 2017, Venkaiah Naidu's resigned from membership of the Rajya Sabha from Rajasthan, due to his election as the Vice President of India.

References

2017 elections in India
2017